Alec Higgins (birth registered fourth ¼ 1908 – third ¼ 1965) was an English professional rugby league footballer who played in the 1920s, 1930s and 1940s.

Background
Higgins' birth was registered in Prescot district, Lancashire, and his death aged 56 was registered in Widnes district, Lancashire, England.

Playing career

International honours
Higgins represented for British Empire while at Widnes in 1937 against France, and won caps for England while at Widnes in 1936 against Wales, in 1937 against France, in 1938 against Wales, and France, in 1938 against Wales, in 1939 against France, and won caps for Great Britain while at Widnes in 1937 against Australia (2 matches).

Challenge Cup Final appearances
Higgins played in Widnes' 18-5 victory over Keighley in the 1936–37 Challenge Cup Final during the 1936–37 season at Wembley Stadium, London on Saturday 8 May 1937.

County Cup Final appearances
Higgins played left-, i.e. number 4, in Widnes' 4-5 defeat by Wigan in the 1928–29 Lancashire County Cup Final during the 1928–29 season at Wilderspool Stadium, Warrington on Saturday 24 November 1928, played left-, i.e. number 8, in Widnes' 7-3 victory over Wigan in the 1945–46 Lancashire County Cup Final during the 1945–46 season at Wilderspool Stadium, Warrington on Saturday 27 October 1945.

Genealogical information
Alec Higgins was the younger brother of the rugby league footballer; Jack Higgins, the older brother of the rugby league footballer; Fred Higgins and the father of rugby union footballer Reg Higgins.

Note
Alec Higgins is occasionally misnamed as "Harold", this error was previously shown on the rugbyleagueproject.org reference, that has now been corrected.

References

External links
(archived by web.archive.org) Wilderspool hosts memorable win
(archived by web.archive.org) Statistics at rugby.widnes.tv

1908 births
1965 deaths
British Empire rugby league team players
England national rugby league team players
English rugby league players
Great Britain national rugby league team players
Lancashire rugby league team players
Rugby league centres
Rugby league locks
Rugby league players from Prescot
Rugby league props
Rugby league second-rows
Widnes Vikings players